Negative pH is an electronic music band from Oakland, California, that formed in 2000. The two band members met through Mp3.com in mid-1999. Joshua Fanene and Micheal Bailey co-write the band's songs  with influences including Nine Inch Nails, Pendulum, Ennio Morricone, Ozzy Osbourne, Pitchshifter, and Aphex Twin. The band has four albums including liminal space, which was self-released in 2004, OVRMND, 201X and 201Y. They have been featured in both local and national publications like Hyperactive Magazine issue #7.

Band members

Joshua John Fanene: keyboards, Musical Instrument Digital Interface sequencing, spoken word, chorus, guitar
Micheal Bailey: keyboards, Musical Instrument Digital Interface sequencing, chorus

Discography

Scribe Machine - Fragile Maxi-Single [Remix] (2003)
The UNLV Polar Bear Club - Support Your F***'n Local Scene Compilation [Propaganda] (2004)
Negative pH - liminal space (2005)
Kid Deposit Triumph - Our Peace Will Destroy Many [Hidden Track Remix] (2006) 
Negative pH - OVRMND (2009)
Shatterance - Hold Your Tongue and Say Apple - Therapy [Hidden Track Remix] (2009)
A.P.B. -- Realtime Media, and Electronic Arts -- WK [In-game soundtrack] (2010) 
Negative pH - 201X (2014)
Negative pH - 201Y (2014)

References

External links
Official Website: Negative pH
Facebook
MySpace
Last.fm

Electronic music groups from California